Alfred DuPont Chandler Jr. (September 15, 1918 – May 9, 2007) was a professor of business history at Harvard Business School and Johns Hopkins University, who wrote extensively about the scale and the management structures of modern corporations. His works redefined business and economic history of industrialization. He received the Pulitzer Prize for History for his work, The Visible Hand: The Managerial Revolution in American Business (1977). He was a member of both the American Academy of Arts and Sciences and the American Philosophical Society. He has been called "the doyen of American business historians".

Family and life
Chandler was the great-grandson of Henry Varnum Poor. "Du Pont" was apparently a family name given to his grandfather because his great-grandmother was raised by the Du Pont family, and there are other connections as well.

Chandler graduated from Phillips Exeter Academy in 1936 and Harvard College in 1940. After World War II, he returned to Harvard, finished his M.A. in 1946, and earned his doctorate in 1952 under the direction of Frederick Merk. He taught at M.I.T. and Johns Hopkins University before arriving at Harvard Business School in 1970.

Publications
Chandler used the papers of his ancestor Henry Varnum Poor, a leading analyst of the railway industry, the publisher of the American Railroad Journal, and a founder of Standard & Poor's, as a basis for his Ph.D. thesis.

Chandler began looking at large-scale enterprise in the early 1960s. His book Strategy and Structure: Chapters in the History of the Industrial Enterprise (1962) examined the organization of E.I. du Pont de Nemours and Company, Standard Oil of New Jersey, General Motors, and Sears, Roebuck and Co. He found that managerial organization developed in response to the corporation's business strategy. The book was voted the eleventh most influential management book of the 20th century in a poll of the Fellows of the Academy of Management.

This emphasis on the importance of a cadre of managers to organize and run large-scale corporations was expanded into a "managerial revolution" in The Visible Hand: The Managerial Revolution in American Business (1977) for which he received a Pulitzer Prize. He pursued that book's themes further in Scale and Scope: The Dynamics of Industrial Capitalism, (1990) and co-edited an anthology on the same themes, with Franco Amatori and Takashi Hikino, Big Business and the Wealth of Nations (1997).

The Visible Hand
Chandler's masterwork was The Visible Hand: The Managerial Revolution in American Business (1977). His first two chapters looked at traditional owner-operated small business operations in commerce and production, including the largest among them, the slave plantations in the South. Chapters 3-5 summarize the history of railroad management, with stress on innovations not just in technology but also in accounting, finance and statistics. He then turned to the new business operations made possible by the rail system in mass distribution, such as jobbers, department stores and mail order. A quick survey (ch 8) review mass innovation in mass production. The integration of mass distribution and mass production (ch 9-11) led to many mergers and the emergence of giant industrial corporations by 1900. Management for Chandler was much more than the CEO, it was the whole system of techniques and included middle management (ch 11) as well as the corporate structure of the biggest firms, Standard Oil, General Electric, US Steel, and DuPont (ch 13-14). Chandler argued that managerial firms evolved in order to take advantage of productive techniques available after the rail network was in place. These firms had a higher productivity and lower costs resulting in higher profits. The firms created the "managerial class" in America because they needed to coordinate the increasingly complex and interdependent system. According to Steven Usselman, this ability to achieve efficiency through coordination, and not some anti-competitive monopolistic greed by robber barons, explained the high levels of concentration in modern American industry.

Organizational synthesis
Along with economist Oliver E. Williamson and historians Louis Galambos, Robert H. Wiebe, and Thomas C. Cochran, Chandler was a leading historian of the notion of organizational synthesis.

He argued that during the 19th century, the development of new systems based on steam power and electricity created a Second Industrial Revolution, which resulted in much more capital-intensive industries than had the industrial revolution of the previous century. The mobilization of the capital necessary to exploit these new systems required a larger number of workers and managers, and larger physical plants than ever before. More particularly, the thesis of The Visible Hand is that, counter to other theses regarding how capitalism functions, administrative structure and managerial coordination replaced Adam Smith's "invisible hand" (market forces) as the core developmental and structuring impetus of modern business.

In the wake of this increase of industrial scale, three successful models of capitalism emerged, which Chandler associated with the three leading countries of the period: Great Britain ("personal capitalism"), the United States ("competitive capitalism") and Germany ("cooperative capitalism.")

Despite the important differences in these three models, the common thread among the developed nations is that the large industrial firm has been the engine of growth in three ways: first, it has provided focal points for capital and labor on large scales; second, it became the educator whereby a nation learned the pertinent technology and developed managerial skills; third, it served as the core around which medium and small firms that supply and serve it grew.

Influence
Chandler's work was somewhat ignored in history departments, but proved influential in business, economics, and sociology.

In the business field, Chandler, along with Kenneth R. Andrews and Igor Ansoff, has been credited with the foundational role in introducing and popularizing the concept of business strategy.

In sociology, prior to Chandler's research, some sociologists assumed there were no differences between governmental, corporate, and nonprofit organizations. Chandler's focus on corporations clearly demonstrated that there were differences, and this thesis has influenced organizational sociologists' work since the late 1970s. It also motivated sociologists to investigate and critique Chandler's work more closely, turning up instances in which Chandler assumed American corporations acted for reasons of efficiency, when they actually operated in a context of politics or conflict.

See also

 Business history
 Second Industrial Revolution
 James Burnham

Bibliography
 Chandler, Alfred D. "The beginnings of 'big business' in American industry" Business History Review 33#1 (1959): 1-31. 
 Chandler, Alfred D. Jr., 1962/1998, Strategy and Structure: Chapters in the History of the American Industrial Enterprise (MIT Press).
 Chandler, Alfred D. Jr. ed. 1964, Giant Enterprise: Ford, General Motors, and the Automobile Industry. Sources and Readings (Harcourt, Brace & World).
 Chandler, Alfred D. "The railroads: pioneers in modern corporate management" Business History Review 39#1 (1965): 16-40. in JSTOR
 Chandler, Alfred D. "Anthracite coal and the beginnings of the industrial revolution in the United States" Business History Review 46#2 (1972): 141-181.
 Chandler, Alfred D. Jr. 1977, The Visible Hand: The Managerial Revolution in American Business (The Belknap Press of Harvard University Press).
 Chandler, Alfred D. Jr. and Herman Daems, eds. 1980, Managerial Hierarchies: Comparative Perspectives on the Rise of the Modern Industrial Enterprise (Harvard University Press).
 Chandler, Alfred D. "The emergence of managerial capitalism" Business History Review 58#4 (1984): 473-503.
 Chandler, Alfred D. Jr. and Richard S. Tedlow, eds. 1985, The Coming of Managerial Capitalism: A Casebook on the History of American Economic Institutions (R. D. Irwin).
 Chandler, Alfred D. Jr. 1990, Scale and Scope: The Dynamics of Industrial Capitalism (The Belknap Press of Harvard University Press).
 Chandler, Alfred D. "What is a firm?: A historical perspective" European Economic Review 36#2 (1992): 483-492.
 Chandler, Alfred D. Jr. and James W. Cortada, eds. 2000, A Nation Transformed by Information: How Information Has Shaped the United States from Colonial Times to the Present (Oxford University Press).
 Chandler, Alfred D. Jr. 2001, Inventing the Electronic Century: The Epic Story of the Consumer Electronics and Computer Industries (Harvard University Press).
 Chandler, Alfred D. Jr. 2005, Shaping the Industrial Century: The Remarkable Story of the Evolution of the Modern Chemical and Pharmaceutical Industries (Harvard University Press).
 Chandler, Alfred Dupont Jr. 1988, The Essential Alfred Chandler: Essays Toward a Historical Theory of Big Business Thomas K. McCraw, ed. (Harvard Business School Press).

References

Further reading
 John, Richard R. "Elaborations, Revisions, Dissents: Alfred D. Chandler Jr.'s, The Visible Hand After Twenty Years." Business History Review 71#2 (1997): 151-200.  online
 John, Richard R. "Turner, Beard, Chandler: Progressive Historians." Business History Review 82.02 (2008): 227-240.
 Laird, Pamela Walker. "Alfred D. Chandler Jr. and the Landscape of Marketing History." Journal of Macromarketing 20#2 (2000): 167-173.
 Sicilia, David B. "Cochran's Legacy: A Cultural Path Not Taken." Business and Economic History (1995): 27-39.
 K.E. Aupperle, W. Acar & D. Mukherjee: “Revisiting the Fit-Performance Thesis Half a Century Later: A Historical Financial Analysis of Chandler's Own Matched and Mismatched Firms.”  Business History (2013), .
 W. Acar, R.J Keating, K.E. Aupperle, W.W. Hall & R.A. Engdahl: “Peering at the Past Century's Corporate Strategy Through the Looking Glass of Time-Series Analysis: Extrapolating from Chandler's Classic Mid-Century American Firms?”  Journal of Management Studies, (2003) 40 (5): 1225-1254.

External links

 
  Summary of The Visible Hand: The Managerial Revolution in American Business by Max Olson

Archives and records
Alfred D. Chandler, Jr. papers at Baker Library Special Collections, Harvard Business School.
 Poor family Papers, 1791-1921. Schlesinger Library , Radcliffe Institute, Harvard University.
 Additional papers of the Poor family, 1778-2008. Schlesinger Library , Radcliffe Institute, Harvard University.

1918 births
2007 deaths
20th-century American historians
20th-century American male writers
Economic historians
Harvard College alumni
Harvard Business School faculty
Historians of the United States
Johns Hopkins University faculty
Massachusetts Institute of Technology faculty
People from New Castle County, Delaware
Bancroft Prize winners
Pulitzer Prize for History winners
Phillips Exeter Academy alumni
Tower Hill School alumni
20th-century American Episcopalians
American male non-fiction writers
Members of the American Philosophical Society